Melanie Oudin was the defending champion, having won the event in 2012, but chose not to defend her title.

Shelby Rogers won the title, defeating Allie Kiick in the final, 6–3, 7–5.

Seeds

Main draw

Finals

Top half

Bottom half

References 
 Main draw

Boyd Tinsley Women's Clay Court Classic - Singles